Faithless is a 1932 American pre-Code romantic drama film about a spoiled socialite who learns a sharp lesson when she loses all her money during the Great Depression. The film stars Tallulah Bankhead and Robert Montgomery and is based on Mildred Cram's novel Tinfoil, which was the film's working title.

Plot
Spoiled New York socialite Carol Morgan (Bankhead), romping through the Depression with her lavish lifestyle, breaks off her engagement with Bill Wade (Montgomery) over her refusal to live on his comparatively modest salary rather than her own wealth. To make matters worse, she expresses scorn for his career as an advertising executive. An unplanned sexual encounter seems to resolve their differences until Carol refuses Bill's offer for an expedited wedding at city hall, and again they are unable to come to terms. The impasse ends with Bill leaving her at her opulent home.

Later, when Carol's lawyer and financial manager inform her that she has lost everything, she tentatively reconciles with Bill only to learn from him that he has lost his job the same day. He then informs her that he is going to Chicago with hopes of finding another position there. Further arguments about living together on whatever "meager" income Bill can earn dashes their wedding hopes once again. Disgusted by Carol's pampered personality and lifestyle needs, Bill's younger brother Tony tells her she is a "useless good-for-nothing". To his brother, Tony denounces her as a "courtesan" and predicts, “She’ll end up in the street.” The forgiving and tolerant Bill responds that she is a good person who just does not know it yet.

Carol now finds herself reduced to living off wealthy social climbers she visits and borrowing money from them, but soon the prestige formerly associated with her name dissipates. She then becomes the mistress of Peter Blainey (Hugh Herbert), whose wife had tried to evict her as a disgraced house guest, thus fulfilling part of Tony's cynical prediction. Bill eventually traces Carol to an elegant apartment, one paid for by Blainey. There he finds her with her rich but brutish benefactor. Feeling disgusted with herself after Bill departs, she ends her relationship with Blainey and leaves the apartment, telling him that if she cannot win Bill's forgiveness, she hopes to at least "square it with myself".

On her own, virtually penniless, and unable to find a job, Carol becomes desperate for food and temporarily avoids being evicted from her shabby one-room apartment by selling her shoes to the landlady. She is near collapse from hunger and exhaustion when Bill finds her again and asks her once more to marry him, telling her that the past is done and the slate is clean between them. Bill also tells her that he is now a truck driver, but the company folds, leaving him jobless again; nevertheless, the couple finally marry. As newlyweds they continue to struggle through more hard times until Bill is offered another driving job as a strikebreaker. Strikers, however, threaten him when he arrives for work and later ram his truck with another vehicle as he tries to begin work on his first day.

With Bill severely injured in the wreck, Carol is forced into prostitution to pay his medical bills and their living expenses as she nurses him back to health. She accidentally solicits Tony on the street as he arrives in town, much to his disgust and Carol's humiliation. A policeman arrests her, but takes pity on her and helps her get a job as a waitress by strong-arming the owner of a small diner.

Bill is just on his feet again when his brother Tony arrives at the apartment for a visit, with news that his prediction for Carol had been fulfilled, which he delivers with great contempt before learning to his shock that Carol has indeed become his sister-in-law. Carol then comes in and tells Bill that she had intended to confess and leave as soon as he was well again, adding that she would do it all again given their dire circumstances. After a moment of sadness, Bill embraces Carol and thanks her for saving his life, wiping the slate clean again.

Cast

Tallulah Bankhead as Carol Morgan
Robert Montgomery as William "Bill" Wade
Hugh Herbert as Peter M. Blainey
Maurice Murphy as Anthony "Tony" Wade
Louise Closser Hale as First Landlady
Anna Appel as Mrs Mandel, Second Landlady
Lawrence Grant as Mr Ledyard
Henry Kolker as Mr Carter
Jack Baxley as Candy Store Proprietor (uncredited)
Jay Eaton as Chez Louise Manager (uncredited)
Maude Eburne as Bit part (uncredited)
Sterling Holloway as Photographer (uncredited)
Tenen Holtz as Diner Proprietor (uncredited)
Geneva Mitchell as Party Guest (uncredited)

Production notes
Tallulah Bankhead in 1932 was under contract with Paramount Pictures, but after making five unsuccessful films for the studio, Paramount loaned her to Metro-Goldwyn-Mayer to co-star in Faithless. Hoping to refine her appearance to increase the film's potential at the box office, MGM in the early "wealthy" scenes in Faithless dressed Bankhead in glamorous gowns by Adrian and gave her a new stylish Garbo-type hairdo.

Reception
Film critic Mordaunt Hall, in his 1932 review in The New York Times, described Faithless as a "lumbering species of drama", although he did appreciate the "capable performances" of the two leads. Unlike The New York Times, the influential trade paper Variety found virtually nothing in Faithless to compliment or to recommend to prospective ticket buyers. Variety asserted that Tallulah Bankhead's talents were wasted in the film and the production's storyline was far too heavy-handed and depressing for audiences who were seeking escapism entertainment from their own economic woes:

Another popular entertainment trade paper in 1932, The Film Daily, agreed with Variety'''s review of Faithless as being excessively gloomy and a poor vehicle for showcasing the co-stars' acting abilities:Faithless did, though, have its enthusiastic supporters and promoters in the media during its run in 1932. The Motion Picture Herald, for example, praised both the story and cast, particularly Bankhead's performance. In the opinion of the Herald'', the film's "theme makes it possible for Tallulah Bankhead to turn in an outstanding performance, more vivid than her previous screen appearances."

References and notes

External links

 

1932 films
American romantic drama films
American black-and-white films
Films based on American novels
Films directed by Harry Beaumont
Metro-Goldwyn-Mayer films
1932 romantic drama films
Films based on works by Mildred Cram
1930s English-language films
1930s American films